Meghla Akash also ( meaning of ) is a Bangladeshi Bengali language film. The film directed by Bangladeshi filmmaker Nargis Akter and it is her first directed film. Release 2002 in all over Bangladesh. This thought has brought forward Nargis Akhter's first feature film Meghla Akash that deals with the issue of HIV/AIDS prevention and control. Stars Moushumi, Ayub Khan, Amit Hasan, Shakil Khan, Purnima, Wasimul Bari Rajib, Shahidul Alam Sachchu, Ferdousi Mojimder, Pijush Bandhopadhya and many more. Public consciousness based the films special appearance Indian actress Shabana Azmi The film was appreciated by film critics also film viewers and won the National Film Award of Bangladesh as best director Nargis Akter of the year 2002, with gets won total six categories.

Synopsis
'Meghla' (Moushumi) a beautiful girl, and he loves with 'Moni' (Amit Hasan). Mohit's father rejects Meghla because her uncle can not provide dowry. Meghla leaves her village with broken heart. Khoybor, an evil person, provokes her and tells her that he will find a job for her. Then he sells her in the market for prostitution. This is how the story begins.

Cast

Awards and achievement

National Film Awards
Meghla Akash won the National Film Awards total six categories in the year of 2002.

 Winner Best screenplay : 'Nargis Aktar' 2002
 Winner Best Actress: 'Moushumi ' 2002

Music
The music was arranged and conducted by famous Bangladeshi music director Alauddin Ali; lyrics were provided by Mohammad Rafiquzzaman. Playback singers were as follows: 
Mitali Mukharjee
Protik Dey
Khalid Hasan Milu
Ragob Chowdhury.

References

2002 films
2002 romantic drama films
Bengali-language Bangladeshi films
Bangladeshi romantic drama films
HIV/AIDS in film
Films scored by Alauddin Ali
Films directed by Nargis Akhter
2000s Bengali-language films
2002 directorial debut films
Films whose writer won the Best Screenplay National Film Award (Bangladesh)